Carlos Eduardo Marcora De Santis (born 1 February 1976 in Montevideo) is a Uruguayan footballer.

References

External links
 

1976 births
Living people
Uruguayan footballers
Tigres UANL footballers
Dundee United F.C. players
Paniliakos F.C. players
Panionios F.C. players
Panserraikos F.C. players
Thrasyvoulos F.C. players
Deportes Concepción (Chile) footballers
Scottish Premier League players
Uruguayan expatriate footballers
Uruguayan expatriate sportspeople in Chile
Expatriate footballers in Chile
Expatriate footballers in Scotland
Expatriate footballers in Greece
Association football midfielders